The 2010 BGL Luxembourg Open was a women's tennis tournament on indoor hard courts. It was the 15th edition of the Fortis Championships Luxembourg, and was part of the WTA International tournaments of the 2010 WTA Tour. It was held in Kockelscheuer, Luxembourg, from October 16 through October 24, 2010. Roberta Vinci won the singles title.

Champions

Singles

 Roberta Vinci defeated  Julia Görges 6–3, 6–4.
 It was Vinci's first title of the year, and the third of her career.

Doubles

 Timea Bacsinszky /  Tathiana Garbin defeated  Iveta Benešová /  Barbora Záhlavová-Strýcová 6–4, 6–4

Player commitments

Seeds

 Seeds are based on the rankings of October 11, 2010.

Other entrants
The following players received wildcards into the singles main draw:
  Elena Dementieva
  Mandy Minella
  Yulia Putintseva
  Virginie Razzano

The following players received entry from the qualifying draw:
  Mona Barthel 
  Lucie Hradecká
  Ivana Lisjak
  Kathrin Wörle

The following player received the Lucky loser spot:
  Jill Craybas

External links
Official website 

2010 WTA Tour
2010 BGL Luxembourg Open
2010 in Luxembourgian tennis